Capravirine was a non-nucleoside reverse transcriptase inhibitor which reached phase II trials before development was discontinued by Pfizer. Both phase IIb trials which were conducted failed to demonstrate that therapy with capravirine provided any significant advantage over existing triple-drug HIV therapies, and pharmacology studies showed that capravirine may interact with other HIV drugs.

References 

Abandoned drugs
Carbamates
Chlorobenzenes
Imidazoles
4-Pyridyl compounds
Isopropyl compounds
Thioethers